Avoca Lodge, known as The Molly Brown Summer House, is a Registered Historic Place in southwest Denver, Colorado near Bear Creek.  The home served as a summer retreat for philanthropist, socialite, and activist Margaret Brown and her husband James Joseph Brown. Brown was known as "The Unsinkable Molly Brown" because she survived the sinking of the RMS Titanic. It is open to the public for rental and tours.

References

External links
Molly Brown Summer House
National Register of Historic Places, Colorado, Denver

National Register of Historic Places in Denver
Houses in Denver
Historic house museums in Colorado
Museums in Denver
Houses completed in 1897
Houses on the National Register of Historic Places in Colorado
James Joseph Brown family residences